Mago is a jazz album released by Billy Martin and John Medeski of the jazz trio Medeski Martin & Wood. Mago was recorded over two days in July 2006 and was produced by Martin, who plays drums. Medeski plays Hammond B3 organ.

Track listing
"Introducing Mago"
"Crustaceatron"
"Mojet"
"Apology"
"Bamboo Pants"
"Thundercloud"
"Bonfa"
"Safak"
"Miss Teardrop"
"Sycretism"
"L'Aventura"

References

External links
Amulet Records: Mago - Official Site

2007 albums
Jazz albums by American artists